Choy Kan-pui, BBS, JP (born 1929) is a former Hong Kong legislator and Sha Tin villager. He ran in the 1982 Hong Kong district boards election representing the Tin Sum village in Sha Tin where he rooted and continued his office until 2003. He was also the chairman of the Sha Tin District Council.

He was a member of the Hong Kong Affairs Society, a pro-democratic political group in the 1980s, later turned into the first major pro-democratic party United Democrats of Hong Kong (UDHK). Choy was the founding member of the UDHK but soon later he and Lau Kong-wah quit the party and form a local community organisation Civil Force. He was elected as member of the Legislative Council in Election Committee in the 1995 Legislative Council election in which the electorates were composed of district councillors. He later joined the pro-Beijing pro-business Hong Kong Progressive Alliance (HKPA) and reelected to the Provisional Legislative Council in 1996. In the 2000 Legislative Council election, HKPA supported Choy Kan-pui and Tang Siu-tong to participate in the New Territories East and New Territories West constituencies respectively but Choy failed to go back to the LegCo.

He is currently the member of the Heung Yee Kuk.

References

1929 births
Living people
Hong Kong Progressive Alliance politicians
United Democrats of Hong Kong politicians
Hong Kong Affairs Society politicians
Civil Force politicians
Heung Yee Kuk
District councillors of Sha Tin District
Indigenous inhabitants of the New Territories in Hong Kong
Members of the Provisional Legislative Council
HK LegCo Members 1995–1997
Members of the Selection Committee of Hong Kong